John Peck a.k.a. The Mad Peck (born c. 1942 in New York City) is an American underground cartoonist, rock poster artist, and disc jockey.  His most famous poster is a 1978 comic book-style poster that starts with the line, "Providence, Rhode Island, where it rains two days out of three except during the rainy season when it snows like a bitch."  The poster has been reprinted many times and is widely available for purchase throughout Rhode Island.

Biography 
Raised in New York City, Peck attended Brown University beginning in 1960. Graduating from Brown in 1967, in the intervening years he also attended New York University and the Rhode Island School of Design.

The Mad Peck created silkscreen concert posters for Rhode Island concerts from 1966 to 1971, for acts including Jimi Hendrix, Janis Joplin, The Band, and Cream. His "Final Appearance" Cream poster has been widely bootlegged.

His comix work first appeared in 1969 in underground newspapers like the East Village Other and the Chicago Seed. Consisting mostly of manipulated clip art from old advertisements, his strips advertised items like "GIANT INHALER" and "FREE CIGARETTE PAPERS". Hippies and yippies would send five cents for one of his minicomic catalogs. This led to the weekly comic Burn of the Week, which was distributed by the Underground Press Syndicate and offered phoney endorsements of Wayne Newton albums next to bong-building tips.

In the late 1960s/early 1970s Peck fell in with other Providence countercultural types, including writer Les Daniels and comedian Martin Mull. 1971, Peck illustrated Daniel's Comix: A History of Comic Books in America (Dutton), one of the first academic histories of the medium.

By the mid 1970s, The Mad Peck was creating a regular comic which ran monthly in Creem, and also plugged products in a bizarre pop culture mish-mash similar to some of Bill Griffith's Zippy the Pinhead work.

Averse to publicity or being photographed, the Mad Peck has also been known to DJ under the name "Dr. Oldie." He is based in Providence, Rhode Island.

Books 
 Mad Peck Studios: A 20 Year Retrospective (Doubleday, 1987)

References

External links 
 

Underground cartoonists
Living people
1942 births
Artists from Providence, Rhode Island